Nekima Valdez Levy Armstrong ( Levy-Pounds, c. 1976) is an American lawyer and social justice activist. She served as president of the Minneapolis chapter of the NAACP from 2015 to 2016. She has led a variety of organizations that focus on issues of racial equality and disparity in the Minneapolis–Saint Paul area. Levy Armstrong was an associate professor of law at the University of St. Thomas in Minneapolis from 2003 to 2016. After concluding her term as an NAACP chapter president and leaving her academic post, she had an unsuccessful campaign for mayor of Minneapolis in the 2017 election. She has been a prominent local activist in several protests over the killing of black Americans by police officers.

Early life and education
Levy Armstrong was born on June 27, 1976, in Jackson, Mississippi, the eldest sister of five. She moved to South Central Los Angeles after spending the first eight years of her life in Mississippi, and at fourteen years old was accepted to attend the Brooks School of North Andover, Massachusetts, as a boarding student. She earned a Bachelor of Arts degree from the University of Southern California and a Juris Doctor degree from the University of Illinois College of Law. Levy Armstrong lived in Los Angeles until 2003 when she moved to the U.S. state of Minnesota.

Career

Professorship and community projects
Levy Armstrong was an associate law professor at the University of St. Thomas beginning in 2003. In 2006, Levy Armstrong founded the Community Justice Project, a partnership between the University of St. Thomas School of Law and the Saint Paul chapter of the NAACP, for law students interested in working with underserved communities.

In 2011, Levy Armstrong was the director of an African American history museum in South Minneapolis. The project garnered several large donations, loans from prominent community organizations like the Carl Pohlad Foundation, and the potential commitment of state bonding money. However, the project had financial difficulties that eventually led to its closure and the sale of its building at auction.

Levy Armstrong co-founded Brotherhood Inc., an organization dedicated to helping young African American men stay away from gang activity and prison. She chairs the Minnesota State Advisory Committee to the United States Commission on Civil Rights and Everybody In, a nonprofit with the goal of closing race-based employment gaps in the Minneapolis–Saint Paul area.

Black Lives Matter movement
Levy Armstrong participated in the anti-police brutality protests in Ferguson, Missouri in mid 2014. She also took part in a Black Lives Matter protest of police brutality at the Mall of America in Bloomington, Minnesota in December 2014. She and ten other protesters were charged by the City of Bloomington with disorderly conduct and trespass which carried a maximum penalty of a fine up to $8,000 and a prison sentence of up to two years. Restitution charges for $40,000 against the protesters were later withdrawn by the city. In November 2015, a Hennepin County judge dismissed the charges against Levy Armstrong and the ten others charged by Bloomington.

Minneapolis NAACP presidency

In 2015, Levy Armstrong became president of the Minneapolis chapter of the NAACP when outgoing president Jerry McAfee decided against seeking re-election. Though she won the election unopposed on the ballot, Levy Armstrong faced criticism from McAfee who contended that she was too focused on issues of police brutality to the neglect of concerns such as other violent crime against African Americans. Levy Armstrong stated that she hoped to increase youth engagement with the NAACP during her term with the organization. She has been critical of racial disparities in the Minneapolis–Saint Paul region, describing them as some of the nation's worst.

In November 2015, following the shooting death of Jamar Clark at the hands of Minneapolis police officers, Levy Armstrong was involved in a human blockade of Interstate 94. Of the approximately 40 protesters, Levy Armstrong was among the first arrested. She led some subsequent protests against Clark's killing.

Levy Armstrong left her professorship with University of St. Thomas in 2016 to devote herself full-time to addressing issues of economic and racial justice. She announced in October of that year that she did not intend to seek a second term as president of the Minneapolis NAACP, but that she " to have an even more visible presence in the community". Her successor at the chapter, Jason Sole, credited Levy Armstrong for aligning the more policy- and paperwork-oriented organization with the Black Lives Matter movement.

Mayoral campaign
A year after the death of Jamar Clark, Levy Armstrong announced her intention to run for mayor of Minneapolis in the city's 2017 election as a member of the Minnesota Democratic–Farmer–Labor Party. The announcement was held outside Minneapolis's fourth precinct police station, where protesters had demonstrated against Clark's killing for 18 days the year before. Levy Armstrong faced incumbent mayor Betsy Hodges, also a member of the Democratic–Farmer–Labor, and several other candidates. Although running as a member of the Democratic–Farmer–Labor, Armstrong opted to forego the party nomination process, citing what she described as the "confusing and unwelcoming" nature of the party's caucuses and convention. She lost to Jacob Frey in the November 2017 election, coming in fifth overall.

Community activism

In 2020, Levy Armstrong participated in local protests over the murder of George Floyd, an unarmed African-American man, by a white Minneapolis police officer. She was present when police officers fired tear gas on protesters without warning at the Minneapolis third police precinct station the afternoon of May 26 as a separate, smaller group of demonstrators were throwing objects at officers. The incident resulted in Levy Armstrong being a named party in a U.S. District Court complaint filed by the American Civil Liberties Union of Minnesota over the right to peaceful protest. Levy Armstong was critical of Minneapolis police union leader Bob Kroll, and participated in protests calling for his resignation. A 100-person protest group led by Levy Armstrong's Racial Justice Network that gathered outside Kroll's home in Hugo, Minnesota, on August 15, 2020, drew controversy. In addition to calling for Kroll's resignation, the group criticized Kroll's partner, WCCO television reporter Liz Collin, for having a conflict of interest in stories about police violence. Some protesters bashed piñata effigies of Kroll and Collin, which was condemned by local media members for being a symbolic display of violence against a woman journalist.

Personal life
Levy Armstrong lived in Brooklyn Park, Minnesota, until September 2015 when she moved to north Minneapolis. She is married and has five children, two of whom are adopted.  In the mid-2010s, she preached at Minneapolis's First Covenant Church every other month.

References

1976 births
Living people
African-American activists
21st-century African-American women
21st-century American lawyers
21st-century American women lawyers
Activists from California
African-American academics
African-American women writers
American bloggers
American women academics
American women bloggers
Black Lives Matter people
Brooks School alumni
Lawyers from Jackson, Mississippi
Lawyers from Los Angeles
Minnesota lawyers
University of Illinois College of Law alumni
University of Southern California alumni
University of St. Thomas (Minnesota) faculty
Writers from Minneapolis
Writers from Jackson, Mississippi
Writers from Los Angeles
Women civil rights activists
20th-century African-American people
20th-century African-American women